Paul Egerton Piesse is a former co-leader of the Alliance, a New Zealand political party, and union activist.

Biography
Piesse has been heavily involved in the union movement, and has held a number of senior organisational roles. He was originally a supporter of the Labour Party, and in  stood for Labour in the Rangiora electorate, coming second. 

In the lead up to the  Piesse controversially challenged Mary Batchelor for the Labour nomination in the Avon electorate. The contest went to a second vote before Batchelor eventually emerged victorious.

He joined NewLabour in protest at the economic policies Labour pursued ("Rogernomics") in the late 1980s. NewLabour eventually helped form the Alliance, and Piesse became involved in the new party. In the 1999 election, he stood as the Alliance candidate in the  electorate, winning 6.7% of the vote. He was ranked 58th on the Alliance list.

Following the splintering of the Alliance, Piesse sided with the Harré-McCarten faction. He was not on the party list. After Harré and McCarten also left the Alliance, Piesse was elected co-leader, alongside Jill Ovens. In the 2005 election he also stood for the Alliance.

Piesse was elected President of the Alliance Party at the 2007 national conference held in Dunedin. In the 2008 election he contested the Christchurch East electorate and was number 4 on the Alliance Party list. He fared poorly, coming eighth with only 119 votes. The Alliance also did poorly, winning only 0.08% of the party vote nationwide. In the 2011 election he also stood for the Alliance.

The Alliance deregistered at its own request in May 2015, though appears to still be active. Piesse's role in the party is unclear, and the most recent statements of his role as president are 2011. 

As of 2015, Piesse has been a sitting member of the Executive Committee of Converge, a left-wing online community network as well as being an active participant in Hobgoblin, a similar enterprise.

References

Year of birth missing (living people)
Living people
Alliance (New Zealand political party) politicians
Leaders of political parties in New Zealand
NewLabour Party (New Zealand) politicians
New Zealand Labour Party politicians
Unsuccessful candidates in the 1969 New Zealand general election
Unsuccessful candidates in the 1999 New Zealand general election
Unsuccessful candidates in the 2002 New Zealand general election
Unsuccessful candidates in the 2005 New Zealand general election
Unsuccessful candidates in the 2008 New Zealand general election
Unsuccessful candidates in the 2011 New Zealand general election
21st-century New Zealand politicians